Tom Bimmermann (born December 26, 1971) is a Luxembourgian composer.

Career
Bimmermann studied from 1980 to 1992 at the Utrecht Conservatory. There he studied harmony, counterpoint, fugue, and the musical aesthetics of a piano. From 1993 until 1996, he studied at the Mozarteum in Salzburg, obtaining a Symphony Orchestra Conductor diploma. A member of The Luxembourg Society for Contemporary Music, his film scores include Verso (2009), Monster Kids (2008), Brotherhood of Blood (2007), and Why.

Works
 Thème et Variations pour piano 1989 11'
 Synphonie N° 2 en re majeur 	1989-91 21'  1.2.2.2. - 2.2.0.0. - timp, perc(2), archi
 Klaviertrio 1992 14'
 Letzebuerg an Europa 	1992 8' Orchestre d'harmonie
 Pour Anne 1994 7' piano solo
 Quatuor à cordes en do majeur 1999 17'
 Intermezzo  1999 5' for orchestre à cordes
 Symphonic Muse 2008

References

External links
Luxembourg Opperetta
Artist's website

1971 births
Living people
Luxembourgian composers